{| class="infobox" style="width:22em; text-align:left; font-size:90%; vertical-align:middle; background:#eef;"
|+ <span style="font-size: 9pt">'Lexicon awards and nominations</span>
|- style="background:white;"
| colspan="2" style="text-align:center;" | 
|-
| 
| colspan="1" width=50 
|
|-
| 
| colspan="1" width=50 
|
|-
| 
| colspan="2" width=50  
|}
  Lexicon (stylized in all caps) is the third studio album by Isyana Sarasvati, it was released on November 29, 2019, by Sony Music Entertainment Indonesia. The main song of the album is "untuk hati yang terluka.", "ragu Semesta", and "Sikap Duniawi". The Album was sold in a Box Set sold through on @belialbumfisik site and other digital store sites.

Theme and background
LEXICON became Isyana Sarasvati's third album after releasing the album Explore! which was released in November 2015 and Paradox in September 2017. Different from the previous 2 albums in the Pop and R&B genres, LEXICON album carries a theatrical theme which is the classic or opera genre is Isyana's true identity. All the songs on the LEXICON album are neo classic and one song with a progressive rock genre entitled "Lexicon". On this album, Isyana tries to show her idealism side.

LEXICON contains eight song numbers that have been prepared since the end of 2018, but were not immediately given to the Sony Music Entertainment label. The album's introduction was made since releasing the single "untuk hati yang terluka.", "ragu Semesta", as well as the most recent "Sikap Duniawi", released in conjunction with LEXICON. On the day of the release of the album, Isyana also held an intimate showcase for 100 lucky fans and other invited guests.

 Isyana Sarasvati's said at Shoemaker, Cikini, Central Jakarta, Friday, November 29, 2019.

LEXICON summarizes several episodes of Isyana Sarasvati's journey. What's different, this time Isyana freed herself from the production, the selection of producers involved, to the concept of a special box set. The album is produced by Isyana Sarasvati with Gerald Situmorang, Kenan Loui, and Tohpati. The work of the LEXICON album was done for one month until finally it was released to close this November. Isyana played a full role in the arrangement of songs in the album.

Track listing

Concerts

Awards

Anugerah Musik Indonesia

Billboard Indonesia

Forbes

Jak FM (2020 Local Music Heroes)

KISS Awards

Maya Awards

Pop Hari Ini

Tempo magazine

tirto.id

Review 

Yucki, bernadetta from  Cultura Magazine  gave the following response "Presenting classical music with lyrics like old poetic literature". Overall, Isyana Sarasvati has shown its true colors in music and well executed. Through each single in this album, Isyana made the music genre relevant again in the Indonesian music industry. With honest lyrics and beautiful & poetic word choice, every track in LEXICON is able to be a medicine and inspiration for listeners to live their lives.

References

External links 
 Detail Album on iTunes
 Detail of music streaming
 Detail Album on Spotify
 Detail Album on deezer

2019 albums
Isyana Sarasvati albums